This is a list of MPs who lost their seat at the 2017 United Kingdom general election, together with the last date when each seat was represented by a different party.

Open seats changing hands

Notes

References 

2017 United Kingdom general election
Lists of British MPs who were defeated by election